Shipsa is a genus of spring stoneflies in the family Nemouridae. It is monotypic, being represented by the single species, Shipsa rotunda.

References

Further reading

 
 

Nemouridae
Articles created by Qbugbot